Paule Marie Yvonne Prévost Boppe (8 June 1878 – 3 March 1942) was a French tennis player at the end of the 19th century. She won the French Women's Singles Championship in 1900.

At the 1900 Summer Olympics in Paris, she won two silver medals. In the women's singles final she lost to Charlotte Cooper and in the mixed doubles' event she and Harold Mahony were runners-up to Charlotte Cooper and Reginald Doherty.

Biography 
Yvonne Prévost was the daughter of Ernest Prévost, son of Hippolyte Prévost, and Jeanne Koenigswarter, daughter of the lawyer Louis-Jean Koenigswarter, a member of an important banking family from Austria. She was the sister of André Prévost, vice-champion of France in tennis in 1900.

Ranked "-40" in 1897 and 1902, Yvonne Prévost was a member of the sports society of the island of Puteaux and the Tennis Club of Paris.

In 1900, she became the French champion with no competitor to challenge for the title, which was quite common at that time. However, she is mainly known for having participated a few weeks later in the international tennis tournament organized by the S.S.I.P. during the Universal Exhibition, a tournament that would be considered an Olympic event.  She won the silver medal in women's singles, losing in the final to three-time English champion Charlotte Cooper-Sterry. She was also a finalist in the mixed doubles' tournament, partnered with Harold Mahony of Ireland.

Olympic finals

Singles (1 silver medal)

Mixed Doubles (1 silver medal)

Notes

References

External links
 
 French Open – Past Women's Singles Champions
 Olympics profile

1878 births
1942 deaths
French female tennis players
French Championships (tennis) champions
Olympic tennis players of France
Tennis players at the 1900 Summer Olympics
Olympic silver medalists for France
Olympic medalists in tennis
Medalists at the 1900 Summer Olympics
Tennis players from Paris